House of Wolves is a 2016 Hong Kong comedy film co-written and directed by Vincent Kok, who also appears in a supporting role in the film, and starring Francis Ng and Ronald Cheng. The film was released on 21 January 2016.

Plot
Charlie (Francis Ng) is a swindler who pretends to be a patient with amyotrophic lateral sclerosis patient, while Fung Yan-ping (Ronald Cheng) is an idle village leader. These two self-proclaimed wicked men fall in love at first sight with Yu Chun (Jiang Shuying), a newcomer to the village. Chun arrives to the village after falling out with her ex-boyfriend and is pregnant with their child. While helpless, Chun devises a scheme where she invites Charlie and Yan-ping to her house for dinner, causing them to be drunk and mistakenly believing that one of them have impregnated her. Unable to find out who the real father of the child, Charlie and Yan-ping both take care of Chun. One day, Charlie and Yan-ping realize that neither one of them are the father of Chun's father, and furiously return her to her ex-boyfriend in exchange for cash. Afterwards, by chance, Charlie and Yan-ping discovers that Chun's ex-boyfriend plan to use their child for an experiment and decides to rescue Chun and her unborn child.

Cast
Francis Ng as Charlie
Ronald Cheng as Fung Yan-ping
Jiang Shuying as Yu Chun
Candice Yu
Babyjohn Choi
Ella Koon
Derek Tsang
Vincent Kok

Guest appearance
Lam Chi-chung
Ha Chun-chau
Steven Fung
Tam Ping-man
Cheung Tat-ming
Sam Lee
Josie Ho
Bonnie Wong
Yu Mo-lin
Lo Fan
Eman Lam
Wylie Chiu
Ken Lo
Tin Kai-man
Terence Tsui
Kwok Wai-kwok
Cheng Man-fai
Lydia Lau
Louis Yuen
Chrissie Chau

Music

Theme song
Sunny Day, Cloudy Day, Rainy Day (晴天陰天雨天)
Composer/Singer: Ronald Cheng
Lyricist: Tang Wai-sing
Arranger: Dennie Wong

Insert theme
La chanson dé liseuse
Composer/Arranger: Dennie Wong
Lyricist/Singer: Vicky Fung

References

External links
 

2016 films
2016 comedy films
Hong Kong comedy films
Hong Kong slapstick comedy films
2010s Cantonese-language films
Films directed by Vincent Kok
Films set in Hong Kong
Films shot in Hong Kong
2010s Hong Kong films